Bacillus atticus atticus is a species of phasmid or "walking stick" with recorded specimens in Greece, Italy, Croatia and Israel. In Cyprus, the endemic subspecies Bacillus atticus cyprius is present. Both can often be found climbing on plants

Description 
Adults have a slim body about 80 mm long, with a stripe on each side. Their antennae are red and short. The forelegs are strong, around 50 mm long, painted red at their base.

Behaviour 
Bacillus atticus atticus is mostly active at night, when it feeds. The usual foods of this species are plants such as ivy and lettuce. During the day, the animal stays absolutely still, camouflaged as a stick, matching the color of the plant that it's on. If disturbed, its main defense is to feign death. Like many phasmids it is parthenogenetic so it can reproduce on its own by laying eggs. The eggs are ovoid-shaped with some distinguishable glyphics around them and a sponge-like shape on the top.

See also 
Bacillus rossius, the endemic Bacillus of Western Mediterranean Europe

References

External links 

Phasmatodea
Insects described in 1882
Phasmatodea of Europe
Taxa named by Carl Brunner von Wattenwyl